The canton of Questembert is an administrative division of the Morbihan department, northwestern France. Its borders were modified at the French canton reorganisation which came into effect in March 2015. Its seat is in Questembert.

It consists of the following communes:
 
Berric
Caden
Le Cours
Elven
Larré
Lauzach
Limerzel
Malansac
Molac
Pluherlin
Questembert
Rochefort-en-Terre
Saint-Gravé
Sulniac
Trédion
La Vraie-Croix

References

Cantons of Morbihan